Funky Tekno Tribe (FTT) has been known as a driving force behind the world-famous San Francisco nightlife community since 1991.  FTT events such as Organic, Le Theatre Du Futur’, and Halloween Tribal Massive have garnered high acclaim both nationally and internationally as some of the most reputable dance events to attend in North America.

FTT resident DJ’s such as DJ Dan, Donald Glaude, Mark Farina, Jeno, Tony Hewitt, Graeme, DJ Sneak, DJ Rap, Daft Punk, Basement Jaxx have played all over the world and have released UK Billboard chart-topping dance tracks.  FTT has also been credited as the first North American promoters to tour the United States culminating with the Paleothic Trance Tour 1995, Instinctive Travels Tour 1997, Generations World Tour 2000, and Reunite the Tribes Tour 2002. FTT have also collaborated with: Jane’s Addiction (Re-union Tour, Enit Festival), Cypress Hill (Smoke Out Festival), Limp Bizkit, Run DMC, Perry Farrell, Goldie, Daft Punk (US Debut), Roni Size & Reprazent (US Debut), and Chemical Brothers.

Music promoters